This article displays the rosters for the participating teams at the 2012 Supertaça Compal.

CAB Madeira

FC do Porto

Maxaquene

Petro Atlético

Primeiro de Agosto

Recreativo do Libolo

External links
Interbasket Forum Page

References

Supertaça Compal squads